Events from the year 1786 in Spain.

Incumbents
 Monarch – Charles IV

Events

 Convention of London (1786), a treaty between Britain and Spain over Belize.
 Malaria epidemic in Barcelona ends after killing nearly 100,000 people.

Births

Deaths

References

 
1780s in Spain
Years of the 18th century in Spain